The New Hampshire Wildcats represent the University of New Hampshire. They have won five ECAC championships between 1986 and 1996. When the Wildcats joined Hockey East, they won four Hockey East titles from 2006 to 2009. The Wildcats have more wins than any other women's ice hockey program at 668 in its first 32 years. The Wildcats went undefeated in their initial 74 games (73-0-1) spanning the 1978 through 1982 seasons. A UNH goaltender has been declared Hockey East Goaltending Champion in the first six years of the league's existence. From 2007 to 2009, UNH hosted NCAA Tournament Regional home games.

Year by year

History
The Wildcats competed in the first AWCHA Division I National Ice Hockey Championship. Contested in March 1998, the Wildcats defeated the Brown Bears by a 4-1 score, to become the first recognized national champion in women's college ice hockey. On January 15, 2000, Carisa Zaban recorded her second straight hat trick (including her 100th career goal), while Samantha Holmes scored one goal and five assists. The Wildcats defeated Northeastern by a score of 9-1.

2006 to 2008
From 2005-06 to 2007-08, the Wildcats set school records with 33 wins in 2006 and 2008. The 2006 team broke seven team and three individual UNH records as well as four team and one individual NCAA records, and 14 team and five individual Hockey East records. In addition, the club had its first perfect season at the Whittemore Center in 2006 (17-0-0).
In 2006-07, the club was ranked No. 1 in the nation during the 2007 season (ended at No. 4). The club's 28 wins in 2007 ranks fourth on program's single-season list.

The following year, in 2007-08, New Hampshire was ranked No. 1 in the nation for eight weeks. The Wildcats ended the year #1 in the nation in penalty kill, #2 in offense, #2 in defense and #2 in power play. The 2008 Wildcats broke six Hockey East team records and tied two others en route to the league's first undefeated season. During the 2007-08 season, Sam Faber of New Hampshire set an NCAA record (since tied) for most game winning goals in one season with 13.

Current roster

2022–23 Wildcats
As of September 9, 2022.

Erin Whitten
Erin Whitten shut out Dartmouth College in her collegiate debut. She began her coaching career when she joined the UNH women's ice hockey staff on July 17, 2000. On July 27, 2006, she was promoted to the position of associate head coach on July 27, 2006.

First Outdoor Game
The Northeastern University women's hockey team faced off against New Hampshire at Fenway Park on Jan. 8, 2010, in the first outdoor women's college hockey game ever played. The Wildcats came from behind to win the game by a score of 5-3, with a four goal rally in the third period. The 4 p.m. game played between the Huskies and Wildcats was the first game of a Hockey East Doubleheader. The men's teams at Boston College and Boston University played at 7:30 p.m. It was the 110th all-time matchup between the Huskies and the Wildcats. In the prior 109 matches, New Hampshire had a 73-28-7 record vs. the Huskies.

Notable players
 Kacey Bellamy
 Karyn Bye
 Colleen Coyne
 Tricia Dunn
Samantha "Sam" Faber (born 1987)
 Samantha Holmes
 Sue Merz
 Kelly Paton
Erin Whitten (Four-year varsity goaltender at New Hampshire from 1989–93)
Carisa Zaban
In the 2009-10 season, Kelly Paton ranked near the top in several scoring categories in the NCAA. She ranked fourth in assists per game (1.00), fifth in points per game (1.59) and tied for sixth in points (51). She led the Wildcats in points (51), goals (19) and plus/minus (plus-16). Paton was named Hockey East co-Player of the Year and won the Hockey East Three Stars Award. In addition, Paton was a unanimous All-Hockey East First Team selection, three-time Hockey East Player of the Month and three-time Hockey East Player of the Week.

Championships and accolades
UNH's history includes four consecutive EAIAW (Eastern Association for Intercollegiate Athletics for Women) titles from 1980–83 and five ECAC titles (1986-87-90-91-96).
In 1998, New Hampshire won the inaugural women's ice hockey championship (sponsored by the American Women's College Hockey Alliance) in 1998 at the FleetCenter in Boston. In that 1998 season, Brandy Fisher won the inaugural Patty Kazmaier Memorial Award as the top women's collegiate player. Four Wildcats were also members of the 1998 gold-medal winning U.S. Olympic team.
  ECAC titles (1990, 1991)
  ECAC runner-up (1992, 1993)
  Appeared in the Frozen Four in 2006 and 2008
  Hockey East regular-season champions in ‘04 ‘05 ‘06 ‘07 ‘08
  Hockey East Tournament champions in ‘06 ‘07 ‘08

Awards and honors

National Awards and Honors 

 Courtney Birchard, 2010 Women's RBK Hockey Division I All-America Second Team 
 Erin Whitten, USA Hockey Women's Player of the Year (1994
Ava Boutilier, New Hampshire, Women's Hockey Commissioners Association Goaltender of the Month February 2020

Patty Kazmaier Award 

 Brandy Fisher was the inaugural Patty Kazmaier Award winner in 1998.
 Finalists: Nicki Luongo in 1999, Carisa Zaban in 2000 and Kelly Paton in 2010
 Martine Garland, Top 10 Finalist for 2007 Patty Kazmaier Award
 Kira Misikowetz, Top 10 Finalist for 2002 Patty Kazmaier Award

Conference Awards

All Rookie Team 
Nicole Kelly, 2020-21 Hockey East Pro Ambitions All-Rookie Team
 Kristina Lavoie, 2010 WHEA All-Rookie Team

All Star Team 
 Courtney Birchard, 2010 WHEA First-Team All-Star
 Micaela Long, 2010 WHEA First-Team All-Star
 Kelly Paton, 2010 WHEA First-Team All-Star
 Kristina Lavoie, 2010 WHEA Honorable Mention All-Star
 Erin Whitten,  ECAC First Team (1992 and 1993)
 Erin Whitten,  ECAC All-Star Selection (equivalent to First Team status) in 1990 and 1991

Player of the Year 

 Kelly Paton, 2010 Hockey East Co-Player of the Year
 Carolyn Gordon, 2003-04 Hockey East Player of the Year

Rookie of the Year 

 Kristina Lavoie, 2010 Hockey East Rookie of the Year

Goaltender of the Year 

 Erin Whitten,  ECAC Goaltender of the Year (1992)

Hockey East Monthly Awards
 Kelly Paton – New Hampshire, WHEA Player of the Month, October 2009
 Kelly Paton – New Hampshire, WHEA Player of the Month, November 2009
 Kelly Paton – New Hampshire, WHEA Player of the Month, February 2010

Other Awards 
Winny Brodt, 1998 AWCHA Tournament Most Outstanding player
Lindsey Dumond, New Hampshire, 2021 Hockey East Best Defensive Forward Award
 Tricia Dunn, Forward, New Hampshire; 1996 ECAC All-Tournament Team
Brandy Fisher, F, 1996 ECAC Tournament most valuable player
Samantha Holmes, 1999-2000 New England Hockey Writers Association Women's Division I All-Star Team 
 Jen Huggon, All-America honors in 2003
Carrie Jokiel, 2000 Sarah Devens Award
 Micaela Long, 2010 Hockey East Scoring Champion
 Nicki Luongo, 1999 American Women's College Hockey Alliance All-Americans, First Team
 Kerry Maher, 1999-2000 New England Hockey Writers Association Women's Division I All-Star Team
 Kira Misikowetz, Forward, 2001-02 New England Hockey Writers Women's Division I All-Star Team
 Kelly Paton, Runner Up, 2010 Hockey East Scoring Champion
 Kelly Paton, 2010 Frozen Four Skills Competition participant
 Kelly Paton, 2010 Women's RBK Hockey Division I All-America First Team 
 Heather Reinke, Defense, 1996 All-ECAC Team
 Heather Reinke, Defense, 1996 ECAC All-Tournament Team
 Dina Solimini, Goaltender, 1996 ECAC All-Tournament Team
 Dina Solimini, 1996 ECAC Honor Roll
 Erin Whitten, UNH Department of Women's Athletics Athlete of the Year (1993)
 Carisa Zaban, 1996 ECAC Honor Roll
Carisa Zaban, 1999 American Women's College Hockey Alliance All-Americans, Second Team
Carisa Zaban, 1999-2000 New England Hockey Writers Association Women's Division I All-Star Team
Carisa Zaban, 1999-2000 All-America selection

Team Scoring Champions

Wildcats in professional hockey

See also
 New Hampshire Wildcats men's ice hockey
 New Hampshire Wildcats
 List of college women's ice hockey coaches with 250 wins (Russ McCurdy ranks tenth in wins, first in winning percentage on all-time list)

References

 
Ice hockey teams in New Hampshire